The women's singles squash event of the 2011 Pan American Games was held October 15–17 at the Squash Complex in Guadalajara. The defending Pan American Games champion was Natalie Grainger of the United States.

The athletes were drawn into an elimination stage draw. Once an athlete lost a match, she was no longer able to compete.
Each match was contested as the best of five games. A game was won when one side first scores 10 points. A point was awarded to the winning side of each rally. If the score became 11-all, the side which gained a two-point lead first won that game.

Draw

Finals

Top half

Bottom half

References

External links
Women's singles squash draw

Squash at the 2011 Pan American Games
Pan